Theodore of Enaton was an Egyptian Christian monk who lived in the monastery of Enaton in Lower Egypt during the 4th century. He was one of the Desert Fathers. Theodore of Enaton was a disciple of Abba Amoun and was also a companion of Abba Or.

In 308 A.D., Theodore went to live as a monk in Enaton.

His feast day is November 17.

References

3rd-century births
4th-century deaths
Egyptian Christian monks
Saints from Roman Egypt
Eastern Catholic saints
Coptic Orthodox saints
Desert Fathers